San Lorenzo is a village in Tuscany, central Italy, administratively a frazione of the comune of Suvereto, province of Livorno. At the time of the 2011 census its population was 72.

San Lorenzo is about 80 km from Livorno and 5 km from Suvereto.

Bibliography

External links 
 

Frazioni of Suvereto